ZAP-X may refer to:

 ZAPX, a former family movie block on the television channel YTV
 ZAP-X, a battery-powered electric vehicle manufactured by ZAP